Bates Pond is a  pond in Carver, Massachusetts. The pond is located south of Edaville Railroad. Huckleberry Corner lies along the southern shore of the pond. The water quality is impaired due to non-native plants in the pond.

External links
Environmental Protection Agency

Ponds of Plymouth County, Massachusetts
Ponds of Massachusetts